Manuel Bachmann (born 1 April 1975) is a retired Swiss football midfielder.

References

1975 births
Living people
Swiss men's footballers
FC Luzern players
Association football midfielders
20th-century Swiss people